General elections were held in the Marshall Islands on 17 November 2003. Although there are no legally incorporated political parties on the Islands, candidates to the Legislature stood either as supporters of President Kessai Note's government (constituting an informal "United Democratic Party"), or on an opposition platform (Aelon̄ Kein Ad).

Results
The pro-government side increased its overall majority by one seat.

References

Elections in the Marshall Islands 
Marshall Islands
General
Legislature of the Marshall Islands
Non-partisan elections
Election and referendum articles with incomplete results